The Edmundian orogeny is a preserved low-grade reworking of sedimentary to metasedimentary rocks in the Gascoyne Complex of Western Australia from 1.68 billion to 1.46 billion years ago.

See also
List of orogenies

References

Orogenies of Australia
Proterozoic orogenies